The International Journal of Nephrology and Renovascular Disease is an open-access peer-reviewed medical journal focusing on kidney and vascular supply studies. It was established in 2008 and is published by Dove Medical Press. It is abstracted and indexed in PubMed, EMBASE, and Scopus.

External links 
 

English-language journals
Open access journals
Dove Medical Press academic journals
Nephrology journals
Publications established in 2008